Cordova is an unincorporated community in Grant County, in the U.S. state of Kentucky.

History
A post office called Cordova was established in 1849, and remained in operation until it was discontinued in 1906. The name of the community commemorates the Córdova Rebellion.

References

Unincorporated communities in Grant County, Kentucky
Unincorporated communities in Kentucky